Abdul Nasser is a male Muslim given name, and in modern usage, surname. The name means "servant of the Helper", An-Nasser being a Muslim theophoric name.

The letter a of the al- is unstressed, and can be transliterated by almost any vowel, often by u. The short "u" is taken from the classical Arabic nominative case ending, whereby the first element of the name is "'Abdu". Because the letter n is a sun letter, the letter l of the al- can be assimilated to it. Thus, although the name is written in Arabic with letters corresponding to Abd al-Nasser, the pronunciation can correspond to Abd an-Nasser. Alternative transliterations of the last element include Naaser, Nasir and others, with the whole name subject to variable spacing and hyphenation.

It may refer to:

Gamal Abdel Nasser (1918–1970), president of Egypt
Khalid Abdel Nasser (1949–2011), his son, activist
Abdul Nasser Bani Hani (died 2013), Jordanian politician
Abdul Nacer Benbrika (born ), Algerian-Australian Muslim activist
Abd Al Nasir Mohammed Abd Al Qadir Khantumani (born 1960), Syrian held in Guantanamo Bay
Abdel Nasser Tawfik (born 1967), Egyptian physicist
Abdelnasser Ouadah (born 1975), Algerian footballer
Abdulnaser Slil (born 1981), Libyan footballer
Abdul Nasir (Guantanamo detainee 874) (born 1981), Afghan
Abdoul Nassirou Omouroun (born 1987), Togolese footballer
Abdinasir Said Ibrahim (born 1989), Somali athlete
Abd Al Naser Hasan (born 1990), Syrian footballer
Abd al-Nasir al-Janabi, Iraqi politician
Abdul Nasir (cricketer, born 1983), Pakistani cricketer
Abdul Nasir (cricketer, born 1998), Pakistani cricketer
Abdul Nasir bin Amer Hamsah, a Malay Singaporean who was sentenced to a total of 38 years in jail for his involvement in the 1994 Oriental Hotel Murder and the kidnapping of two police officers in 1996.
Khalil Mamut (born 1977), Uyghur refugee imprisoned at Guantanamo Bay, also known as Abdul Nasser
Abdel Nasser El-Gohary (born 1970), Egyptian poet
Abdel Nasser Ould Ethmane, founding member of SOS Slaves
Abdel Nasser Barakat (born 1974), Palestinian football manager
Abdul Nasser Qardash, Iraqi militant
Abdulnasser Al-Obaidly (born 1972), Qatari footballer
Abdul Nasser El Hakim (born 1960), Curaçaoan businessman and politician
Abdul Nasser Al-Sayegh (born 1959), Kuwaiti fencer
Abdul Nazer Mahdani (born 1966), Indian politican
Abdulnasser Mugali, Yemeni poet and writer
Abdinasir Ali Hassan, Somali Kenyan entrepreneur
Muhammad Abdul Nasir, Indian politician
Abdelnasser Rashid, American politician

References